Bernd Karrenbauer (born 5 March 1944) is a German ice hockey player, who competed for SC Dynamo Berlin. He won the Pool B tournament with the East Germany national team at the 1969 World Championships.

He also participated in the 1968 Winter Olympics as a member of the East Germany national team, scoring three goals and two assists in seven games played.

References

1944 births
Living people
German ice hockey forwards
Sportspeople from Rome
Ice hockey players at the 1968 Winter Olympics
Olympic ice hockey players of East Germany
SC Dynamo Berlin (ice hockey) players
Germanophone Italian people